The 1990–91 season was the 94th season of competitive football in Scotland. It was notable for the fact that there was a last day title decider at Ibrox between Rangers and Aberdeen. Both teams went into the match level on points and goal difference, but Rangers needed to win the match because Aberdeen had scored two goals more. Rangers won the title with a 2–0 win thanks to two goals by Mark Hateley.

Notable events

11 November – Duncan Ferguson makes his debut, playing for Dundee United against Rangers at Ibrox, in a match they won 2–1.

Scottish Premier Division

Champions: Rangers
No Relegation

Scottish League Division One

Promoted: Falkirk, Airdrieonians
Relegated: Clyde, Brechin City

Scottish League Division Two

Promoted: Stirling Albion, Montrose

Other honours

Cup honours

Individual honours

SPFA awards

SFWA awards

Scotland national team

Key:
(H) = Home match
(A) = Away match
ECQG2 = European Championship qualifying – Group 2

See also
 1990–91 Aberdeen F.C. season
 1990–91 Dundee United F.C. season
 1990–91 Rangers F.C. season

Notes and references

 
Seasons in Scottish football